The  International System of Units, known by the international abbreviation SI in all languages and sometimes pleonastically as the SI system, is the modern form of the metric system and the world's most widely used system of measurement.  Established and maintained by the General Conference on Weights and Measures (CGPM), it is the only system of measurement with an official status in nearly every country in the world, employed in science, technology, industry, and everyday commerce.

The SI comprises a coherent system of units of measurement starting with seven base units, which are the second (symbol s, the unit of time), metre (m, length), kilogram (kg, mass), ampere (A, electric current), kelvin (K, thermodynamic temperature), mole (mol, amount of substance), and candela (cd, luminous intensity). The system can accommodate coherent units for an unlimited number of additional quantities. These are called coherent derived units, which can always be represented as products of powers of the base units. Twenty-two coherent derived units have been provided with special names and symbols.

The seven base units and the 22 coherent derived units with special names and symbols may be used in combination to express other coherent derived units. Since the sizes of coherent units will be convenient for only some applications and not for others, the SI provides twenty-four prefixes which, when added to the name and symbol of a coherent unit produce twenty-four additional (non-coherent) SI units for the same quantity; these non-coherent units are always decimal (i.e. power-of-ten) multiples and sub-multiples of the coherent unit. The SI is intended to be an evolving system; units and prefixes are created and unit definitions are modified through international agreement as the technology of measurement progresses and the precision of measurements improves.

Since 2019, the magnitudes of all SI units have been defined by declaring that seven defining constants have certain exact numerical values when expressed in terms of their SI units. These defining constants are the speed of light in vacuum , the hyperfine transition frequency of caesium , the Planck constant , the elementary charge , the Boltzmann constant , the Avogadro constant , and the luminous efficacy . In 2019, their values were fixed by definition to their best estimates at the time, ensuring continuity with previous definitions of the base units.

The current way of defining the SI is a result of a decades-long move towards increasingly abstract and idealised formulation in which the realisations of the units are separated conceptually from the definitions. A consequence is that as science and technologies develop, new and superior realisations may be introduced without the need to redefine the unit. One problem with artefacts is that they can be lost, damaged, or changed; another is that they introduce uncertainties that cannot be reduced by advancements in science and technology. The last artefact used by the SI was the International Prototype of the Kilogram, a cylinder of platinum–iridium.
 
The original motivation for the development of the SI was the diversity of units that had sprung up within the centimetre–gram–second (CGS) systems (specifically the inconsistency between the systems of electrostatic units and electromagnetic units) and the lack of coordination between the various disciplines that used them. The General Conference on Weights and Measures (French:  – CGPM), which was established by the Metre Convention of 1875, brought together many international organisations to establish the definitions and standards of a new system and to standardise the rules for writing and presenting measurements. The system was published in 1960 as a result of an initiative that began in 1948, so it is based on the metre–kilogram–second system of units (MKS) rather than any variant of the CGS.

Introduction 

The International System of Units, or SI, is a decimal and metric  system of units established in 1960 and periodically updated since then. The SI has an official status in most countries, including the United States, Canada, and the United Kingdom, although these three countries are amongst a handful of nations that, to various degrees, also continue to use their customary systems. Nevertheless, with this nearly universal level of acceptance, the SI "has been used around the world as the preferred system of units, the basic language for science, technology, industry and trade."

The only other types of measurement system that still have widespread use across the world are the Imperial and US customary measurement systems, and they are legally defined in terms of the SI. There are other, less widespread systems of measurement that are occasionally used in particular regions of the world. In addition, there are many individual non-SI units that don't belong to any comprehensive system of units, but that are nevertheless still regularly used in particular fields and regions. Both of these categories of unit are also typically defined legally in terms of SI units.

Controlling body

The SI was established and is maintained by the General Conference on Weights and Measures (CGPM). In practice, the CGPM follows the recommendations of the Consultative Committee for Units (CCU), which is the actual body conducting technical deliberations concerning new scientific and technological developments related to the definition of units and the SI. The CCU reports to  the International Committee for Weights and Measures (CIPM), which, in turn, reports to the CGPM. See below for more details.

All the decisions and recommendations concerning units are collected in a brochure called The International System of Units (SI), which is published by the International Bureau of Weights and Measures (BIPM) and periodically updated.

Overview of the units

SI base units
The SI selects seven units to serve as base units, corresponding to seven base physical quantities. They are the second, with the symbol , which is the SI unit of the physical quantity of time; the metre, symbol , the SI unit of length; kilogram (the unit of mass); ampere (electric current); kelvin (thermodynamic temperature); mole (amount of substance); and candela (luminous intensity). All units in the SI can be expressed in terms of the base units, and the base units serve as a preferred set for expressing or analysing the relationships between units.

SI derived units
The system allows for an unlimited number of additional units, called derived units, which can always be represented as products of powers of the base units, possibly with a nontrivial numeric multiplier. When that multiplier is one, the unit is called a coherent derived unit. The base and coherent derived units of the SI together form a coherent system of units (the set of coherent SI units). Twenty-two coherent derived units have been provided with special names and symbols. The seven base units and the 22 derived units with special names and symbols may be used in combination to express other derived units, which are adopted to facilitate measurement of diverse quantities.

Why SI kept the distinction between base and derived units

Prior to its redefinition in 2019, the SI was defined through the seven base units from which the derived units were constructed as products of powers of the base units. After the redefinition, the SI is defined by fixing the numerical values of seven defining constants. This has the effect that the distinction between the base units and derived units is, in principle, not needed, since all units, base as well as derived, may be constructed directly from the defining constants. Nevertheless, the distinction is retained because 'it is useful and historically well established', and also because the ISO/IEC 80000 series of standards specifies base and derived quantities that necessarily have the corresponding SI units.

SI metric prefixes and the decimal nature of the SI
Like all metric systems, the SI uses metric prefixes to systematically construct, for the same physical quantity, a set of units that are decimal multiples of each other over a wide range.

For example, while the coherent unit of length is the metre, the SI provides a full range of smaller and larger units of length, any of which may be more convenient for any given application – for example, driving distances are normally given in kilometres (symbol ) rather than in metres. Here the metric prefix 'kilo-' (symbol 'k') stands for a factor of 1000; thus,  = .

The current version of the SI provides twenty-four metric prefixes that signify decimal powers ranging from  10−30 to 1030, the most recent being adopted in 2022. Most prefixes correspond to integer powers of 1000; the only ones that do not are those for 10, 1/10, 100, and 1/100.

In general, given any coherent unit with a separate name and symbol, one forms a new unit by simply adding an appropriate metric prefix to the name of the coherent unit (and a corresponding prefix symbol to the coherent unit's symbol). Since the metric prefix signifies a particular power of ten, the new unit is always a power-of-ten multiple or sub-multiple of the coherent unit. Thus, the conversion between different SI units for one and the same physical quantity is always through a power of ten. This is why the SI (and metric systems more generally) are called decimal systems of measurement units.

The grouping formed by a prefix symbol attached to a unit symbol (e.g. '', '') constitutes a new inseparable unit symbol. This new symbol can be raised to a positive or negative power and can be combined with other unit symbols to form compound unit symbols.

Coherent and non-coherent SI units
When prefixes are used with the coherent SI units, the resulting units are no longer coherent, because the prefix introduces a numerical factor other than one. The one exception is the kilogram, the only coherent SI unit whose name and symbol, for historical reasons, include a prefix.

The complete set of SI units consists of both the coherent set and the multiples and sub-multiples of coherent units formed by using the SI prefixes. For example, the metre, kilometre, centimetre, nanometre, etc. are all SI units of length, though only the metre is a coherent SI unit. A similar statement holds for derived units: for example, /, etc. are all SI units of density, but of these, only  is a coherent SI unit.

Moreover, the metre is the only coherent SI unit of length. Every physical quantity has exactly one coherent SI unit, although this unit may be expressible in different forms by using some of the special names and symbols.

On the other hand, several different quantities may share the same coherent SI unit.  For example, the joule per kelvin (symbol ) is the coherent SI unit for two distinct quantities: heat capacity and entropy; another example is the ampere, which is the coherent SI unit for both electric current and magnetomotive force. This is why it is important not to use the unit alone to specify the quantity.

Furthermore, the same coherent SI unit may be a base unit in one context, but a coherent derived unit in another. For example, the ampere is a base unit when it is a unit of electric current, but a coherent derived unit when it is a unit of magnetomotive force. As perhaps a more familiar example, consider rainfall, defined as volume of rain (measured in ) that fell per unit area (measured in ). Since /  , it follows that the coherent derived SI unit of rainfall is the metre, even though the metre is also the base SI unit of length.

Permitted non-SI units
There is a special group of units that are called "non-SI units that are accepted for use with the SI". See Non-SI units mentioned in the SI for a full list. Most of these, in order to be converted to the corresponding SI unit, require conversion factors that are not powers of ten. Some common examples of such units are the customary units of time, namely the minute (conversion factor of 60 s/min, since 1 min  ), the hour, and the day; the degree (for measuring plane angles,  and the electronvolt (a unit of energy,

New units
The SI is intended to be an evolving system; units and prefixes are created and unit definitions are modified through international agreement as the technology of measurement progresses and the precision of measurements improves.

Defining magnitudes of units
Since 2019, the magnitudes of all SI units have been defined in an abstract way, which is conceptually separated from any practical realisation of them. Namely, the SI units are defined by declaring that seven defining constants have certain exact numerical values when expressed in terms of their SI units. Probably the most widely known of these constants is the speed of light in vacuum, which in the SI by definition has the exact value of  = . In 2019, their values were fixed by definition to their best estimates at the time, ensuring continuity with previous definitions of the base units.

The abstract nature of the definitions of units is what makes it possible to improve and change the mises en pratique as science and technology develop without having to change the actual definitions themselves.

In a sense, this way of defining the SI units is no more abstract than the way derived units are traditionally defined in terms of the base units. Consider a particular derived unit, for example, the joule, the unit of energy. Its definition in terms of the base units is ⋅/. Even if the practical realisations of the metre, kilogram, and second are available, a practical realisation of the joule would require some sort of reference to the underlying physical definition of work or energy—some actual physical procedure for realising the energy in the amount of one joule such that it can be compared to other instances of energy (such as the energy content of gasoline put into a car or of electricity delivered to a household).

The situation with the defining constants and all of the SI units is analogous. In fact, purely mathematically speaking, the SI units are defined as if we declared that it is the defining constant's units that are now the base units, with all other SI units being derived units. To make this clearer, first note that each defining constant can be taken as determining the magnitude of that defining constant's unit of measurement; for example, the definition of  defines the unit  as  =  ('the speed of one metre per second is equal to one th of the speed of light'). In this way, the defining constants directly define the following seven units: 

Further, one can show, using dimensional analysis, that every coherent SI unit (whether base or derived) can be written as a unique product of powers of the units of the SI defining constants (in complete analogy to the fact that every coherent derived SI unit can be written as a unique product of powers of the base SI units).

Specifying fundamental constants vs. other methods of definition
The current way of defining the SI is the result of a decades-long move towards increasingly abstract and idealised formulation in which the
realisations of the units are separated conceptually from the definitions.

The great advantage of doing it this way is that as science and technologies develop, new and superior realisations may be introduced without the need to redefine the units.  Units can now be realised with an accuracy that is ultimately limited only by the quantum structure of nature and our technical abilities but not by the definitions themselves. Any valid equation of physics relating the defining constants to a unit can be used to realise the unit, thus creating opportunities for innovation... with increasing accuracy as technology proceeds.' In practice, the CIPM Consultative Committees provide so-called "mises en pratique (practical techniques), which are the descriptions of what are currently believed to be best experimental realisations of the units.

This system lacks the conceptual simplicity of using artefacts (referred to as prototypes) as realisations of units to define those units: with prototypes, the definition and the realisation are one and the same. However, using artefacts has two major disadvantages that, as soon as it is technologically and scientifically feasible, result in abandoning them as means for defining units. One major disadvantage is that artefacts can be lost, damaged, or changed. The other is that they largely cannot benefit from advancements in science and technology. The last artefact used by the SI was the International Prototype Kilogram (IPK), a particular cylinder of platinum-iridium; from 1889 to 2019, the kilogram was by definition equal to the mass of the IPK. Concerns regarding its stability on the one hand, and  progress in precise measurements of the Planck constant and the Avogadro constant on the other, led to a revision of the definition of the base units, put into effect on 20 May 2019. This was the biggest change in the SI since it was first formally defined and established in 1960, and it resulted in the definitions described above.

In the past, there were also various other approaches to the definitions of some of the SI units. One made use of a specific physical state of a specific substance (the triple point of water, which was used in the definition of the kelvin); others referred to idealised experimental prescriptions (as in the case of the former SI definition of the ampere and the former SI definition (originally enacted in 1979) of the candela).

In the future, the set of defining constants used by the SI may be modified as more stable constants are found, or if it turns out that other constants can be more precisely measured.

History
The original motivation for the development of the SI was the diversity of units that had sprung up within the centimetre–gram–second (CGS) systems (specifically the inconsistency between the systems of electrostatic units and electromagnetic units) and the lack of coordination between the various disciplines that used them. The General Conference on Weights and Measures (French:  – CGPM), which was established by the Metre Convention of 1875, brought together many international organisations to establish the definitions and standards of a new system and to standardise the rules for writing and presenting measurements.

Adopted in 1889, use of the MKS system of units succeeded the centimetre–gram–second system of units (CGS) in commerce and engineering. The metre and kilogram system served as the basis for the development of the International System of Units (abbreviated SI), which now serves as the international standard. Because of this, the standards of the CGS system were gradually replaced with metric standards incorporated from the MKS system.

This system was strongly promoted by electrical engineer George A. Campbell.

The International System was published in 1960, based on the MKS units, as a result of an initiative that began in 1948.

Controlling authority
The SI is regulated and continually developed by three international organisations that were established in 1875 under the terms of the Metre Convention. They are the General Conference on Weights and Measures (CGPM), the International Committee for Weights and Measures (CIPM), and the International Bureau of Weights and Measures (BIPM). The ultimate authority rests with the CGPM, which is a plenary body through which its Member States act together on matters related to measurement science and measurement standards; it usually convenes every four years. The CGPM elects the CIPM, which is an 18-person committee of eminent scientists. The CIPM operates based on the advice of a number of its Consultative Committees, which bring together the world's experts in their specified fields as advisers on scientific and technical matters. One of these committees is the Consultative Committee for Units (CCU), which is responsible for matters related to the development of the International System of Units (SI), preparation of successive editions of the SI brochure, and advice to the CIPM on matters concerning units of measurement. It is the CCU which considers in detail all new scientific and technological developments related to the definition of units and the SI. In practice, when it comes to the definition of the SI, the CGPM simply formally approves the recommendations of the CIPM, which, in turn, follows the advice of the CCU.

The CCU has the following as members: national laboratories of the Member States of the CGPM charged with establishing national standards; relevant intergovernmental organisations and international bodies;
international commissions or committees;
scientific unions; personal members;
and, as an ex officio member of all Consultative Committees, the Director of the BIPM.

All the decisions and recommendations concerning units are collected in a brochure called The International System of Units (SI), which is published by the BIPM and periodically updated.

Units and prefixes
The International System of Units consists of a set of base units, derived units, and a set of decimal-based multipliers that are used as prefixes. The units, excluding prefixed units, form a coherent system of units, which is based on a system of quantities in such a way that the equations between the numerical values expressed in coherent units have exactly the same form, including numerical factors, as the corresponding equations between the quantities. For example, 1 N = 1 kg × 1 m/s2 says that one newton is the force required to accelerate a mass of one kilogram at one metre per second squared, as related through the principle of coherence to the equation relating the corresponding quantities: .

Derived units apply to derived quantities, which may by definition be expressed in terms of base quantities, and thus are not independent; for example, electrical conductance is the inverse of electrical resistance, with the consequence that the siemens is the inverse of the ohm, and similarly, the ohm and siemens can be replaced with a ratio of an ampere and a volt, because those quantities bear a defined relationship to each other. Other useful derived quantities can be specified in terms of the SI base and derived units that have no named units in the SI, such as acceleration, which is defined in SI units as m/s2.

Base units

The SI base units are the building blocks of the system and all the other units are derived from them.

Derived units

The derived units in the SI are formed by powers, products, or quotients of the base units and are potentially unlimited in number. Derived units are associated with derived quantities; for example, velocity is a quantity that is derived from the base quantities of time and length, and thus the SI derived unit is metre per second (symbol m/s). The dimensions of derived units can be expressed in terms of the dimensions of the base units.

Combinations of base and derived units may be used to express other derived units. For example, the SI unit of force is the newton (N), the SI unit of pressure is the pascal (Pa)—and the pascal can be defined as one newton per square metre (N/m2).

{| class="wikitable floatleft" style="margin:1em auto 1em auto;line-height:1.4"
|+ SI derived units with special names and symbols
|-
! scope="col" | Name
! scope="col" | Symbol
! scope="col" | Quantity
! scope="col" | In SI base units
! scope="col" | In other SI units
|-
! scope="row" | radian
| style="text-align:center;"| rad
| plane angle
| style="text-align:center;"| m/m
| style="text-align:center;"| 1
|-
! scope="row" | steradian| style="text-align:center;"| sr
| solid angle
| style="text-align:center;"| m2/m2
| style="text-align:center;"| 1
|-
! scope="row" | hertz
| style="text-align:center;"| Hz
| frequency
| style="text-align:center;"| s−1
| 
|-
! scope="row" | newton
| style="text-align:center;"| N
| force, weight
| style="text-align:center;"| kg⋅m⋅s−2
| 
|-
! scope="row" | pascal
| style="text-align:center;"| Pa
| pressure, stress
| style="text-align:center;"| kg⋅m−1⋅s−2
| style="text-align:center;"| N/m2 = J/m3
|-
! scope="row" | joule
| style="text-align:center;"| J
| energy, work, heat
| style="text-align:center;"| kg⋅m2⋅s−2
| style="text-align:center;"| N⋅m = Pa⋅m3
|-
! scope="row" | watt
| style="text-align:center;"| W
| power, radiant flux
| style="text-align:center;"| kg⋅m2⋅s−3
| style="text-align:center;"| J/s
|-
! scope="row" | coulomb
| style="text-align:center;"| C
| electric charge
| style="text-align:center;"| s⋅A
| 
|-
! scope="row" | volt
| style="text-align:center;"| V
| electric potential, voltage, emf
| style="text-align:center;"| kg⋅m2⋅s−3⋅A−1
| style="text-align:center;"| W/A = J/C
|-
! scope="row" | farad
| style="text-align:center;"| F
| capacitance
| style="text-align:center;"| kg−1⋅m−2⋅s4⋅A2
| style="text-align:center;"| C/V = C2/J
|-
! scope="row" | ohm
| style="text-align:center;"| Ω
| resistance, impedance, reactance
| style="text-align:center;"| kg⋅m2⋅s−3⋅A−2
| style="text-align:center;"| V/A = J⋅s/C2
|-
! scope="row" | siemens
| style="text-align:center;"| S
| electrical conductance
| style="text-align:center;"| kg−1⋅m−2⋅s3⋅A2
| style="text-align:center;"| Ω−1
|-
! scope="row" | weber
| style="text-align:center;"| Wb
| magnetic flux
| style="text-align:center;"| kg⋅m2⋅s−2⋅A−1
| style="text-align:center;"| V⋅s
|-
! scope="row" | tesla
| style="text-align:center;"| T
| magnetic flux density
| style="text-align:center;"| kg⋅s−2⋅A−1
| style="text-align:center;"| Wb/m2
|-
! scope="row" | henry
| style="text-align:center;"| H
| inductance
| style="text-align:center;"| kg⋅m2⋅s−2⋅A−2
| style="text-align:center;"| Wb/A
|-
! scope="row" | degree Celsius
| style="text-align:center;"| °C
| temperature relative to 273.15 K
| style="text-align:center;"| K
| 
|-
! scope="row" | lumen
| style="text-align:center;"| lm
| luminous flux
| style="text-align:center;"| cd⋅sr
| style="text-align:center;"| cd⋅sr
|-
! scope="row" | lux
| style="text-align:center;"| lx
| illuminance
| style="text-align:center;"| cd⋅sr⋅m−2
| style="text-align:center;"| lm/m2
|-
! scope="row" | becquerel
| style="text-align:center;"| Bq
| activity referred to a radionuclide (decays per unit time)
| style="text-align:center;"| s−1
| 
|-
! scope="row" | gray
| style="text-align:center;"| Gy
| absorbed dose (of ionising radiation)
| style="text-align:center;"| m2⋅s−2
| style="text-align:center;"| J/kg
|-
! scope="row" | sievert
| style="text-align:center;"| Sv
| equivalent dose (of ionising radiation)
| style="text-align:center;"| m2⋅s−2
| style="text-align:center;"| J/kg
|-
! scope="row" | katal
| style="text-align:center;"| kat
| catalytic activity
| style="text-align:center;"| mol⋅s−1
| 
|-
| colspan="5" |Notes|}

 Dimensionless units 
The unit of a dimensionless quantity is one (symbol 1), but it is rarely shown. The radian and steradian are also dimensionless quantities, but use the symbols rad and sr respectively.

Prefixes

Prefixes are added to unit names to produce multiples and submultiples of the original unit. All of these are integer powers of ten, and above a hundred or below a hundredth all are integer powers of a thousand. For example, kilo- denotes a multiple of a thousand and milli- denotes a multiple of a thousandth, so there are one thousand millimetres to the metre and one thousand metres to the kilometre. The prefixes are never combined, so for example a millionth of a metre is a micrometre, not a millimillimetre. Multiples of the kilogram are named as if the gram were the base unit, so a millionth of a kilogram is a milligram, not a microkilogram. When prefixes are used to form multiples and submultiples of SI base and derived units, the resulting units are no longer coherent.

The BIPM specifies 24 prefixes for the International System of Units (SI):

Non-SI units accepted for use with SI

Many non-SI units continue to be used in the scientific, technical, and commercial literature. Some units are deeply embedded in history and culture, and their use has not been entirely replaced by their SI alternatives. The CIPM recognised and acknowledged such traditions by compiling a list of non-SI units accepted for use with SI:

Some units of time, angle, and legacy non-SI units have a long history of use. Most societies have used the solar day and its non-decimal subdivisions as a basis of time and, unlike the foot or the pound, these were the same regardless of where they were being measured. The radian, being  of a revolution, has mathematical advantages but is rarely used for navigation. Further, the units used in navigation around the world are similar. The tonne, litre, and hectare were adopted by the CGPM in 1879 and have been retained as units that may be used alongside SI units, having been given unique symbols. The catalogued units are given below:

These units are used in combination with SI units in common units such as the kilowatt-hour (1 kW⋅h = 3.6 MJ).

Common notions of the metric units
The basic units of the metric system, as originally defined, represented common quantities or relationships in nature. They still do – the modern precisely defined quantities are refinements of definition and methodology, but still with the same magnitudes. In cases where laboratory precision may not be required or available, or where approximations are good enough, the original definitions may suffice.

In fact, the dimensions of our planet were used by the French Academy in the original definition of the metre.
The metre is close to the length of a pendulum that has a period of 2 seconds; most dining tabletops are about 0.75 metres high; a very tall human (basketball forward) is about 2 metres tall.
The kilogram is the mass of a litre of cold water; a cubic centimetre or millilitre of water has a mass of one gram; a 1-euro coin weighs 7.5 g; a Sacagawea US 1-dollar coin weighs 8.1 g; a UK 50-pence coin weighs 8.0 g.
A candela is about the luminous intensity of a moderately bright candle, or 1 candle power; a 60 W tungsten-filament incandescent light bulb has a luminous intensity of about 64 candelas.
A mole of a substance has a mass that is its molecular mass expressed in units of grams; the mass of a mole of carbon is 12.0 g, and the mass of a mole of table salt is 58.4 g.
Since all gases have the same volume per mole at a given temperature and pressure far from their points of liquefaction and solidification (see Perfect gas), and air is about  oxygen (molecular mass 32) and  nitrogen (molecular mass 28), the density of any near-perfect gas relative to air can be obtained to a good approximation by dividing its molecular mass by 29 (because ). For example, carbon monoxide (molecular mass 28) has almost the same density as air.
A temperature difference of one kelvin is the same as one degree Celsius:  of the temperature differential between the freezing and boiling points of water at sea level; the absolute temperature in kelvins is the temperature in degrees Celsius plus about 273; human body temperature is about 37 °C or 310 K.
A 60 W incandescent light bulb rated at 120 V (US mains voltage) consumes 0.5 A at this voltage. A 60 W bulb rated at 230 V (European mains voltage) consumes 0.26 A at this voltage.

Lexicographic conventions

Unit names
According to the SI Brochure, unit names should be treated as common nouns of the context language. This means that they should be typeset in the same character set as other common nouns (e.g. Latin alphabet in English, Cyrillic script in Russian, etc.), following the usual grammatical and orthographical rules of the context language. For example, in English and French, even when the unit is named after a person and its symbol begins with a capital letter, the unit name in running text should start with a lowercase letter (e.g., newton, hertz, pascal) and is capitalized only at the beginning of a sentence and in headings and publication titles. As a nontrivial application of this rule, the SI Brochure notes that the name of the unit with the symbol  is correctly spelled as 'degree Celsius': the first letter of the name of the unit, 'd', is in lowercase, while the modifier 'Celsius' is capitalized because it is a proper name.

The English spelling and even names for certain SI units and metric prefixes depend on the variety of English used. US English uses the spelling deka-, meter, and liter, whilst International English uses deca-, metre, and litre.

Unit symbols and the values of quantities 
Symbols of SI units are intended to be unique and universal, independent of the context language. The SI Brochure has specific rules for writing them.  The guideline produced by the National Institute of Standards and Technology (NIST) clarifies language-specific details for American English that were left unclear by the SI Brochure, but is otherwise identical to the SI Brochure.

General rules
General rules for writing SI units and quantities apply to text that is either handwritten or produced using an automated process:
 The value of a quantity is written as a number followed by a space (representing a multiplication sign) and a unit symbol; e.g., 2.21 kg, 22 K. This rule explicitly includes the percent sign (%) and the symbol for degrees Celsius (°C). Exceptions are the symbols for plane angular degrees, minutes, and seconds (°, ′, and ″, respectively), which are placed immediately after the number with no intervening space.
 Symbols are mathematical entities, not abbreviations, and as such do not have an appended period/full stop (.), unless the rules of grammar demand one for another reason, such as denoting the end of a sentence.
 A prefix is part of the unit, and its symbol is prepended to a unit symbol without a separator (e.g., k in km, M in MPa, G in GHz, μ in μg). Compound prefixes are not allowed. A prefixed unit is atomic in expressions (e.g., km2 is equivalent to (km)2).
 Unit symbols are written using roman (upright) type, regardless of the type used in the surrounding text.
 Symbols for derived units formed by multiplication are joined with a centre dot (⋅) or a non-breaking space; e.g., N⋅m or N m.
 Symbols for derived units formed by division are joined with a solidus (/), or given as a negative exponent. In cases where a solidus is followed by a centre dot (or space), or more than one solidus is present, parentheses must be used to avoid ambiguity; e.g., kg/(m⋅s2), kg⋅m−1⋅s−2, and (kg/m)/s2 are acceptable, but kg/m/s2 and kg/m⋅s2 are ambiguous and unacceptable.

 The first letter of symbols for units derived from the name of a person is written in upper case; otherwise, they are written in lower case. E.g., the unit of pressure is named after Blaise Pascal, so its symbol is written "Pa", but the symbol for mole is written "mol". Thus, "T" is the symbol for tesla, a measure of magnetic field strength, and "t" the symbol for tonne, a measure of mass. Since 1979, the litre may exceptionally be written using either an uppercase "L" or a lowercase "l", a decision prompted by the similarity of the lowercase letter "l" to the numeral "1", especially with certain typefaces or English-style handwriting. The American NIST recommends that within the United States "L" be used rather than "l".
 Symbols do not have a plural form, e.g., 25 kg, not 25 .
 Uppercase and lowercase prefixes are not interchangeable. E.g., the quantities 1 mW and 1 MW represent two different quantities (milliwatt and megawatt).
 The symbol for the decimal marker is either a point or comma on the line. In practice, the decimal point is used in most English-speaking countries and most of Asia, and the comma in most of Latin America and in continental European countries.
 Spaces should be used as a thousands separator in contrast to commas or periods (1,000,000 or 1.000.000) to reduce confusion resulting from the variation between these forms in different countries.
 Any line-break inside a number, inside a compound unit, or between number and unit should be avoided. Where this is not possible, line breaks should coincide with thousands separators.
 Because the value of "billion" and "trillion" varies between languages, the dimensionless terms "ppb" (parts per billion) and "ppt" (parts per trillion) should be avoided. The SI Brochure does not suggest alternatives.

Printing SI symbols
The rules covering printing of quantities and units are part of ISO 80000-1:2009.

Further rules are specified in respect of production of text using printing presses, word processors, typewriters, and the like.

International System of Quantities
SI Brochure

The CGPM publishes a brochure that defines and presents the SI. Its official version is in French, in line with the Metre Convention. It leaves some scope for local variations, particularly regarding unit names and terms in different languages.

The writing and maintenance of the CGPM brochure is carried out by one of the committees of the International Committee for Weights and Measures (CIPM).
The definitions of the terms "quantity", "unit", "dimension" etc. that are used in the SI Brochure are those given in the International vocabulary of metrology. 

The quantities and equations that provide the context in which the SI units are defined are now referred to as the International System of Quantities (ISQ).
The ISQ is based on the quantities underlying each of the seven base units of the SI. Other quantities, such as area, pressure, and electrical resistance, are derived from these base quantities by clear non-contradictory equations. The ISQ defines the quantities that are measured with the SI units. The ISQ is formalised, in part, in the international standard ISO/IEC 80000, which was completed in 2009 with the publication of ISO 80000-1, and has largely been revised in 2019–2020 with the remainder being under review.

Realisation of units

Metrologists carefully distinguish between the definition of a unit and its realisation. The definition of each base unit of the SI is drawn up so that it is unique and provides a sound theoretical basis on which the most accurate and reproducible measurements can be made. The realisation of the definition of a unit is the procedure by which the definition may be used to establish the value and associated uncertainty of a quantity of the same kind as the unit. A description of the mise en pratique of the base units is given in an electronic appendix to the SI Brochure.

The published mise en pratique is not the only way in which a base unit can be determined: the SI Brochure states that "any method consistent with the laws of physics could be used to realise any SI unit." Various consultative committees of the CIPM decided in 2016 that more than one mise en pratique would be developed for determining the value of each unit. These methods include the following:
Both the Kibble balance and the Avogadro project should be included in the experiments and any differences between these be reconciled.

Evolution of the SI

Changes to the SI
The International Bureau of Weights and Measures (BIPM) has described SI as "the modern form of metric system". Changing technology has led to an evolution of the definitions and standards that has followed two principal strands – changes to SI itself, and clarification of how to use units of measure that are not part of SI but are still nevertheless used on a worldwide basis.

Since 1960 the CGPM has made a number of changes to the SI to meet the needs of specific fields, notably chemistry and radiometry. These are mostly additions to the list of named derived units, and include the mole (symbol mol) for an amount of substance, the pascal (symbol Pa) for pressure, the siemens (symbol S) for electrical conductance, the becquerel (symbol Bq) for "activity referred to a radionuclide", the gray (symbol Gy) for ionising radiation, the sievert (symbol Sv) as the unit of dose equivalent radiation, and the katal (symbol kat) for catalytic activity.

The range of defined prefixes pico- (10−12) to tera- (1012) was extended to quecto- (10−30) to quetta- (1030).

The 1960 definition of the standard metre in terms of wavelengths of a specific emission of the krypton-86 atom was replaced in 1983 with the distance that light travels in vacuum in exactly  second, so that the speed of light is now an exactly specified constant of nature.

A few changes to notation conventions have also been made to alleviate lexicographic ambiguities. An analysis under the aegis of CSIRO, published in 2009 by the Royal Society, has pointed out the opportunities to finish the realisation of that goal, to the point of universal zero-ambiguity machine readability.

2019 redefinitions

After the metre was redefined in 1960, the International Prototype of the Kilogram (IPK) was the only physical artefact upon which base units (directly the kilogram and indirectly the ampere, mole and candela) depended for their definition, making these units subject to periodic comparisons of national standard kilograms with the IPK. During the 2nd and 3rd Periodic Verification of National Prototypes of the Kilogram, a significant divergence had occurred between the mass of the IPK and all of its official copies stored around the world: the copies had all noticeably increased in mass with respect to the IPK. During extraordinary verifications carried out in 2014 preparatory to redefinition of metric standards, continuing divergence was not confirmed. Nonetheless, the residual and irreducible instability of a physical IPK undermined the reliability of the entire metric system to precision measurement from small (atomic) to large (astrophysical) scales.

A proposal was made that:
In addition to the speed of light, four constants of nature – the Planck constant, an elementary charge, the Boltzmann constant, and the Avogadro constant – be defined to have exact values
The International Prototype of the Kilogram be retired
The current definitions of the kilogram, ampere, kelvin, and mole be revised
The wording of base unit definitions should change emphasis from explicit unit to explicit constant definitions.

The new definitions were adopted at the 26th CGPM on 16 November 2018, and came into effect on 20 May 2019. The change was adopted by the European Union through Directive (EU) 2019/1258.

History

The improvisation of units
The units and unit magnitudes of the metric system which became the SI were improvised piecemeal from everyday physical quantities starting in the mid-18th century. Only later were they moulded into an orthogonal coherent decimal system of measurement.

The degree centigrade as a unit of temperature resulted from the scale devised by Swedish astronomer Anders Celsius in 1742. His scale counter-intuitively designated 100 as the freezing point of water and 0 as the boiling point. Independently, in 1743, the French physicist Jean-Pierre Christin described a scale with 0 as the freezing point of water and 100 the boiling point. The scale became known as the centi-grade, or 100 gradations of temperature, scale.

The metric system was developed from 1791 onwards by a committee of the French Academy of Sciences, commissioned to create a unified and rational system of measures. The group, which included preeminent French men of science, used the same principles for relating length, volume, and mass that had been proposed by the English clergyman John Wilkins in 1668;  and the concept of using the Earth's meridian as the basis of the definition of length, originally proposed in 1670 by the French abbot Mouton.

In March 1791, the Assembly adopted the committee's proposed principles for the new decimal system of measure including the metre defined to be 1/10,000,000 of the length of the quadrant of Earth's meridian passing through Paris, and authorised a survey to precisely establish the length of the meridian. In July 1792, the committee proposed the names metre, are, litre and grave for the units of length, area, capacity, and mass, respectively. The committee also proposed that multiples and submultiples of these units were to be denoted by decimal-based prefixes such as centi for a hundredth and kilo for a thousand.

Later, during the process of adoption of the metric system, the Latin gramme and kilogramme, replaced the former provincial terms gravet (1/1000 grave) and grave. In June 1799, based on the results of the meridian survey, the standard mètre des Archives and kilogramme des Archives were deposited in the French National Archives. Subsequently, that year, the metric system was adopted by law in France. The French system was short-lived due to its unpopularity. Napoleon ridiculed it, and in 1812, introduced a replacement system, the mesures usuelles or "customary measures" which restored many of the old units, but redefined in terms of the metric system.

During the first half of the 19th century there was little consistency in the choice of preferred multiples of the base units: typically the myriametre ( metres) was in widespread use in both France and parts of Germany, while the kilogram ( grams) rather than the myriagram was used for mass.

In 1832, the German mathematician Carl Friedrich Gauss, assisted by Wilhelm Weber, implicitly defined the second as a base unit when he quoted the Earth's magnetic field in terms of millimetres, grams, and seconds. Prior to this, the strength of the Earth's magnetic field had only been described in relative terms. The technique used by Gauss was to equate the torque induced on a suspended magnet of known mass by the Earth's magnetic field with the torque induced on an equivalent system under gravity. The resultant calculations enabled him to assign dimensions based on mass, length and time to the magnetic field.

A candlepower as a unit of illuminance was originally defined by an 1860 English law as the light produced by a pure spermaceti candle weighing  pound (76 grams) and burning at a specified rate. Spermaceti, a waxy substance found in the heads of sperm whales, was once used to make high-quality candles. At this time the French standard of light was based upon the illumination from a Carcel oil lamp. The unit was defined as that illumination emanating from a lamp burning pure rapeseed oil at a defined rate. It was accepted that ten standard candles were about equal to one Carcel lamp.

Metre Convention

A French-inspired initiative for international cooperation in metrology led to the signing in 1875 of the Metre Convention, also called Treaty of the Metre, by 17 nations. Initially the convention only covered standards for the metre and the kilogram. In 1921, the Metre Convention was extended to include all physical units, including the ampere and others thereby enabling the CGPM to address inconsistencies in the way that the metric system had been used.

A set of 30 prototypes of the metre and 40 prototypes of the kilogram, in each case made of a 90% platinum-10% iridium alloy, were manufactured by British metallurgy specialty firm and accepted by the CGPM in 1889. One of each was selected at random to become the International prototype metre and International prototype kilogram that replaced the mètre des Archives and kilogramme des Archives respectively. Each member state was entitled to one of each of the remaining prototypes to serve as the national prototype for that country.

The treaty also established a number of international organisations to oversee the keeping of international standards of measurement.

The CGS and MKS systems

In the 1860s, James Clerk Maxwell, William Thomson (later Lord Kelvin) and others working under the auspices of the British Association for the Advancement of Science, built on Gauss's work and formalised the concept of a coherent system of units with base units and derived units christened the centimetre–gram–second system of units in 1874. The principle of coherence was successfully used to define a number of units of measure based on the CGS, including the erg for energy, the dyne for force, the barye for pressure, the poise for dynamic viscosity and the stokes for kinematic viscosity.

In 1879, the CIPM published recommendations for writing the symbols for length, area, volume and mass, but it was outside its domain to publish recommendations for other quantities. Beginning in about 1900, physicists who had been using the symbol "μ" (mu) for "micrometre" or "micron", "λ" (lambda) for "microlitre", and "γ" (gamma) for "microgram" started to use the symbols "μm", "μL" and "μg".

At the close of the 19th century three different systems of units of measure existed for electrical measurements: a CGS-based system for electrostatic units, also known as the Gaussian or ESU system, a CGS-based system for electromechanical units (EMU) and an International system based on units defined by the Metre Convention. for electrical distribution systems. 
Attempts to resolve the electrical units in terms of length, mass, and time using dimensional analysis was beset with difficulties—the dimensions depended on whether one used the ESU or EMU systems. This anomaly was resolved in 1901 when Giovanni Giorgi published a paper in which he advocated using a fourth base unit alongside the existing three base units. The fourth unit could be chosen to be electric current, voltage, or electrical resistance. Electric current with named unit 'ampere' was chosen as the base unit, and the other electrical quantities derived from it according to the laws of physics. This became the foundation of the MKS system of units.

In the late 19th and early 20th centuries, a number of non-coherent units of measure based on the gram/kilogram, centimetre/metre, and second, such as the Pferdestärke (metric horsepower) for power, the darcy for permeability and "millimetres of mercury" for barometric and blood pressure were developed or propagated, some of which incorporated standard gravity in their definitions.

At the end of the Second World War, a number of different systems of measurement were in use throughout the world. Some of these systems were metric system variations; others were based on customary systems of measure, like the US customary system and British Imperial system.

The Practical system of units
In 1948, the 9th CGPM commissioned a study to assess the measurement needs of the scientific, technical, and educational communities and "to make recommendations for a single practical system of units of measurement, suitable for adoption by all countries adhering to the Metre Convention". This working document was Practical system of units of measurement. Based on this study, the 10th CGPM in 1954 defined an international system derived from six base units including units of temperature and optical radiation in addition to those for the MKS system mass, length, and time units and Giorgi's current unit. Six base units were recommended: the metre, kilogram, second, ampere, degree Kelvin, and candela.

The 9th CGPM also approved the first formal recommendation for the writing of symbols in the metric system when the basis of the rules as they are now known was laid down. These rules were subsequently extended and now cover unit symbols and names, prefix symbols and names, how quantity symbols should be written and used, and how the values of quantities should be expressed.

Birth of the SI
In 1960, the 11th CGPM synthesised the results of the 12-year study into a set of 16 resolutions. The system was named the International System of Units, abbreviated SI from the French name, .

Historical definitions
When Maxwell first introduced the concept of a coherent system, he identified three quantities that could be used as base units: mass, length, and time. Giorgi later identified the need for an electrical base unit, for which the unit of electric current was chosen for SI. Another three base units (for temperature, amount of substance, and luminous intensity) were added later.

The early metric systems defined a unit of weight as a base unit, while the SI defines an analogous unit of mass. In everyday use, these are mostly interchangeable, but in scientific contexts the difference matters. Mass, strictly the inertial mass, represents a quantity of matter. It relates the acceleration of a body to the applied force via Newton's law, : force equals mass times acceleration. A force of 1 N (newton) applied to a mass of 1 kg will accelerate it at 1 m/s2. This is true whether the object is floating in space or in a gravity field e.g. at the Earth's surface. Weight is the force exerted on a body by a gravitational field, and hence its weight depends on the strength of the gravitational field. Since the acceleration due to gravity is local and varies by location and altitude on the Earth, weight is unsuitable for precision measurements of a property of a body, and this makes a unit of weight unsuitable as a base unit.

Metric units that are not recognised by the SI

Although the term metric system is often used as an informal alternative name for the International System of Units, other metric systems exist, some of which were in widespread use in the past or are even still used in particular areas. There are also individual metric units such as the sverdrup and the darcy that exist outside of any system of units. Most of the units of the other metric systems are not recognised by the SI.

Here are some examples. The centimetre–gram–second (CGS) system was the dominant metric system in the physical sciences and electrical engineering from the 1860s until at least the 1960s, and is still in use in some fields. It includes such SI-unrecognised units as the gal, dyne, erg, barye, etc. in its mechanical sector, as well as the poise and stokes in fluid dynamics. When it comes to the units for quantities in electricity and magnetism, there are several versions of the CGS system. Two of these are obsolete: the CGS electrostatic ('CGS-ESU', with the SI-unrecognised units of statcoulomb, statvolt, statampere, etc.) and the CGS electromagnetic system ('CGS-EMU', with abampere, abcoulomb, oersted, maxwell, abhenry, gilbert, etc.). A 'blend' of these two systems is still popular and is known as the Gaussian system (which includes the gauss as a special name for the CGS-EMU unit maxwell per square centimetre).

In engineering (other than electrical engineering), there was formerly a long tradition of using the gravitational metric system, whose SI-unrecognised units include the kilogram-force (kilopond), technical atmosphere, metric horsepower, etc. The metre–tonne–second (mts) system, used in the Soviet Union from 1933 to 1955, had such SI-unrecognised units as the sthène, pièze, etc. Other groups of SI-unrecognised metric units are the various legacy and CGS units related to ionising radiation (rutherford, curie, roentgen, rad, rem, etc.), radiometry (langley, jansky), photometry (phot, nox, stilb, nit, metre-candle,:17 lambert, apostilb, skot, brill, troland, talbot, candlepower, candle), thermodynamics (calorie), and spectroscopy (reciprocal centimetre).

In some cases, the SI-unrecognised metric units have equivalent SI units formed by combining a metric prefix with a coherent SI unit. For example, etc. (a related group are the correspondences such as  ≘ ,  ≘ , etc.). Sometimes, it is not even a matter of a metric prefix: the SI-nonrecognised unit may be exactly the same as an SI coherent unit, except for the fact that the SI does not recognise the special name and symbol. For example, the nit is just an SI-unrecognised name for the SI unit candela per square metre and the talbot is an SI-unrecognised name for the SI unit lumen second. Frequently, a non-SI metric unit is related to an SI unit through a power-of-ten factor, but not one that has a metric prefix, e.g.,  = , The angstrom ( = ), still used in various fields, etc. (and correspondences like  ≘ ). Some SI-unrecognised metric units are still frequently used, e.g., the calorie (in nutrition), the rem (in the US), the jansky (in radio astronomy), the gauss (in industry) and the CGS-Gaussian units more generally (in some subfields of physics), the metric horsepower (for engine power, in most of the non-English speaking world), the kilogram-force (for rocket engine thrust, in China and sometimes in Europe), etc. Others are now rarely used, such as the sthène and the rutherford.

See also
 Non-SI units mentioned in the SI

 Notes 

References

Further reading
 
 Unit Systems in Electromagnetism
 MW Keller et al. (PDF) Metrology Triangle Using a Watt Balance, a Calculable Capacitor, and a Single-Electron Tunneling Device
 "The Current SI Seen From the Perspective of the Proposed New SI" (PDF). Barry N. Taylor. Journal of Research of the National Institute of Standards and Technology, Vol. 116, No. 6, Pgs. 797–807, Nov–Dec 2011.
 B. N. Taylor, Ambler Thompson, International System of Units (SI), National Institute of Standards and Technology 2008 edition, .

External linksOfficial BIPM – About the BIPM (home page)
 BIPM – measurement units
 BIPM brochure (SI reference)
 ISO 80000-1:2009 Quantities and units – Part 1: General
 NIST On-line official publications on the SI
 NIST Special Publication 330, 2019 Edition: The International System of Units (SI)
 NIST Special Publication 811, 2008 Edition: Guide for the Use of the International System of Units
 NIST Special Pub 814: Interpretation of the SI for the United States and Federal Government Metric Conversion Policy
 Rules for SAE Use of SI (Metric) Units
 
 EngNet Metric Conversion Chart Online Categorised Metric Conversion CalculatorHistory LaTeX SIunits package manual gives a historical background to the SI.Research'''
 The metrological triangle
 Recommendation of ICWM 1 (CI-2005)

Spelling and usage 
 USMA Frequently Asked Questions about SI

 
Systems of units
International standards